Hoashi (written: 帆足) is a Japanese surname. Notable people with the surname include:

, Japanese baseball player
Keisuke Hoashi (born 1967), American actor

Japanese-language surnames